The Dead Files is an American paranormal television series that premiered September 23, 2011, on the Travel Channel. The program features physical medium Amy Allan and former NYPD homicide detective Steve DiSchiavi, who investigate allegedly haunted locations at the request of their clients in an effort to provide proof of paranormal activity. Each partner is depicted exploring the case independently of the other, so as not to influence their portion of the investigation. They, along with their client(s), then come together during the program's final segment, the "reveal," when they compare their findings with one another.

The series' 14th season aired from October 23, 2021, to April 2, 2022.

Show format
Opening introduction: 

After items such as family pictures, trinkets, or personal effects have been removed from a location claimed to be haunted, Allan walks through attempting to communicate with ghosts and spirits. Meanwhile, Dischiavi questions residents, employees, and local experts in genealogy, local history and law enforcement regarding the site's history. Later, Allan collaborates with a sketch artist to create drawings of spirits she claims to have channeled during her walk-through. The episodes conclude with a "reveal", where the drawings will often appear to match Dischiavi's findings.

Criticism 
According to skeptical reviewer Karen Stollznow, Allan often claims to find the same activity, such as shadow people, in multiple locations. Some items - such as religious iconography - are not removed but often left in locations. Stollznow notes that Allan appears to offer no evidence to verify her suggestion she had no preexisting knowledge of a location, which could be problematic for well-known ones such as Alcatraz or the Lizzie Borden house. Stollznow characterizes DiSchiavi as more of a "biased believer" than a skeptic, and suggests that the show is edited in order to make his investigation appear accurate, removing parts of Allan's observations that don't align with DiSchiavi's findings.

Episodes

See also
 Apparitional experience
 Parapsychology
 Ghost hunting
 Haunted locations in the United States

References

External links
 of The Dead Files

Travel Channel original programming
Paranormal reality television series
2010s American reality television series
2010s American documentary television series
2011 American television series debuts